A mousetrap is a device for catching mice.

Mousetrap or mouse trap may also refer to:
 The Mousetrap, a play by Agatha Christie
 Mousetrap (weapon), a 1942 antisubmarine weapon
 Mousetrap (clothing), a device used to prevent a person from taking off their clothing
 Mouse Trap (board game), a 1963 three-dimensional game
 Mouse Trap (video game), a 1981 arcade game
 Mousetrap (Denver), an informal name for the highway interchange of I-25 and I-70 in Denver, Colorado
 Mousetrapping, a technique used by some websites to prevent visitors from leaving their site
 Cayley's mousetrap, a game invented by Arthur Cayley
 The Murder of Gonzago, the play within the play Hamlet, which the prince names as Mousetrap
 "Mouse Trap", a song by Buckner & Garcia from their album Pac-Man Fever
 "The Mousetrap (Caught In)", a song by Peter Hammill from his album The Future Now
 Mousetrap, a professional wrestling pin popularized by Orange Cassidy

See also
 mau5trap, (pronounced "mousetrap") a Canadian record label